Winter's Orbit is a 2021 LGBT space opera novel, the debut novel by Everina Maxwell. After Prince Taam of Iskat dies mysteriously, his cousin Kiem is forced to marry Taam's widower. The fate of their solar system may hinge on their marriage.

Plot

Iskat is the leader of an empire comprising seven planets. Each solar system must sign a Resolution treaty and be approved by Auditors in order to secure the right to communicate with the wider galaxy. Without a valid Resolution treaty, the Iskat Empire would be immediately conquered by stronger civilizations.

Prince Taam of Iskat is married to Count Jainan of Thea, a planet under Iskat's rule. Taam works on a secret government mining project, operation Kingfisher. He is killed in a flight accident. The Emperor orders Prince Kiem to marry Jainan. Kiem is the Emperor's least favorite grandchild, as well as Taam's cousin.

After an awkward wedding, Kiem and Jainan are interviewed by the Auditor. The Auditor refuses to confirm the pair as Resolution treaty representatives, claiming that Taam was murdered. Jainan finds documentation that Taam's final flight log was doctored, and the pair learns that Jainan is being investigated for the murder. With help from Aren Saffer, a military officer and Taam's friend, they find evidence that Taam was embezzling military funds. They are ordered to stop investigating and fly back to the Imperial Palace, but their flybug crashes. In the trek back to civilization, Kiem and Jainan begin a true romantic relationship.

Kiem finds that the Iskat military was blackmailing Taam with a video of Taam hitting Jainan. Jainan is arrested by the military and is taken to the Kingfisher refinery, where Saffer tortures him. Saffer and the military have used the embezzled money to illegally purchase a weapons cache. They are planning to conquer Iskat's subordinate planets, break from the Resolution treaty, and seize power from the Emperor. Saffer killed Taam to cover up his own embezzlement; he hopes to implant false memories into Jainan and convince him to take the fall.

Kiem breaks into Kingfisher and rescues Jainan. Kiem and Saffer are arrested; Jainan is hospitalized. Jainan leaks the entire story to the press, resulting in a groundswell of support for renewing the Resolution treaty. The Empire is converted into an equal partnership between all seven planets.

Major themes

Gender and gender expression play a unique role in Iskat society. Characters from Iskat show their gender to others by wearing ornaments made of flint (for female), wood (for male), or glass (for non-binary). This explores the idea that gender is performance rather than an innate characteristic. Additionally, because the Iskat Empire imposes its views of gender performance onto its subject planets, the characters' gender performance is used to explore imperialism.

Publication history

The work was originally published in 2017 under the title Course of Honor on the fan website Archive of Our Own. Course of Honor was not fanfiction, but adhered to certain genre conventions which remain present in Winter's Orbit. The novel was later acquired by Tor Books and further developed before being traditionally published.

Reception

The novel received positive critical reviews. Author Amal El-Mohtar, writing for the New York Times, praised the development of Jainan's and Kiem's relationship, calling it "a powerfully simple pleasure". Writing for Locus, reviewer Liz Bourke praised the novel, calling it "a promising debut... well-paced and deftly written". The novel also received praise for its positive portrayal of queer romance and its exploration of gender roles. Publishers Weekly gave the novel a positive review, comparing it to the works of Lois McMaster Bujold. The review wrote that Maxwell "elegantly combines clan politics, galactic power struggles, and marriage dynamics" despite a "soapy conclusion". A reviewer for NPR found the romance to be promising, while feeling that the space opera elements of the story were underdeveloped.

References

2021 British novels
Gay male romance novels
LGBT speculative fiction novels
Space opera novels
2020s LGBT novels
British LGBT novels